The APAN Star Awards is an awards ceremony for excellence in television in South Korea and contribution to Hallyu (Korean wave), organized by the Korea Entertainment Management Association (CEMA). Nominees for the awards are selected from Korean dramas that airs on the three major broadcasting networks (KBS, MBC and SBS) and cable channels (tvN, jtbc, OCN, MBN and TV Chosun) from October of the previous year to September of the current year.

Categories
Grand Prize (대상) is given to the best actor/actress of the year.
Top Excellence in Acting Award (최우수상) 
Excellence in Acting Award (우수상) 
Best Supporting Actor/Actress (조연상), previously known as Acting Award (연기상)
Best New Actor/Actress (신인상), previously known as Rising Star Award (라이징스타상)
Best Young Actor/Actress (아역상)
Best Production Director (연출상)
Best Writer (작가상)
Best Original Soundtrack (베스트OST상) 
Popular Star Award (인기스타상)
Best Couple Award (베스트 커플상) 
Hallyu Star Award (한류 스타상) 
Best Dressed (베스트드레서상), previously known as Fashionista Award (패셔니스타상)
Achievement Award (공로상)
 OTT award : This category was introduced in 2022 from 8th edition of awards.

Grand Prize (Daesang)

Drama of the Year

Top Excellence in Acting Awards

Best Actor

Best Actor in a Miniseries

Best Actor in a Serial Drama

Best Actor in a OTT Drama

Best Actress

Best Actress in a Miniseries

Best Actress in a Serial Drama

Best Actress in a OTT Drama

Excellence in Acting Awards

Best Actor

Best Actor in a Miniseries

Best Actor in a Serial Drama

Best Actor in an OTT Drama

Best Actress

Best Actress in a Miniseries

Best Actress in a Serial Drama

Best Actress in a OTT Drama

Supporting Awards

Best Supporting Actor

Best Supporting Actress

Newcomer Awards

Best New Actor

Best New Actress

Rising Star Award

Youth Awards

Best Young Actor

Best Young Actress

Best Production Director

Best Writer

Best Original Soundtrack

Popularity Awards

Popular Star Award, Actor

Popular Star Award, Actress

Hallyu Star Award

Best Couple Award

Best Dressed

Best Manager

Other Awards

Achievement Award

See also

 List of Asian television awards

Notes

References

External links 
 
2020 Winner's list
2018 Winner's list
2016 Winner's list
2015 Winner's list
2014 Winner's list
2013 Winner's list
2012 Winner's list

 
South Korean television awards
Awards established in 2012
Annual events in South Korea
2012 establishments in South Korea